Yi Yong-ik (6 January 1854 - 1907 Hangul: 이용익 Hanja: 李容翊) was an official, and politician of the Korean Empire. As an official, Yi was very interested in education. He established Bosung College, which later becomes Korea University. As an officer he was also a lieutenant general of the Imperial Korean Army.

Life 
On 6 January 1854, Yi was born in Hamgyong Province. His father, Yi Hak-shin was an official who passed the civil service exam in 1837. His family was a poor, but Yi learned Chinese characters from Seodang. Before becoming an official, Yi was a peddler. During the Gapsin Coup, Yi took Min Young-ik, who was attacked by the Gaewha factions, to Horace Newton Allen. From this incident, Yi became close with Min Young-ik. In 1882, during Imo Incident he helped Min Young-ik to contact with Empress Myeongseong. After the Imo Incident, Gojong appointed him as Busa of Tanchon. In Tanchon, Yi discovered tremendous amount of golds, which aided the government financially.

For these accomplishments, Yi became a high ranked financial officer of the Royal family. But in 1888, Yi was indict for the rebellion in his land, Bukcheong. Yi grew rich by taxing people too much, making a rebellion to occur in Bukcheong area. Because of the rebellion, Yi was exiled to what is now South Jeolla Province. After two months of exile, he was forgiven and brought back to the Korean officialdom. On 28 April 1896, Yi was ordered to supervise mining of South Western area.

From the Korean Empire period, Yi became the most important politicians of the Korean Empire. W.F. Sands described him as the manager of Korean royal estate, and keeper of the Korean Imperial stamp. Yi attempted to increase the royal estate through the Jeon-hwan Section. The Independence Club criticized his policy of increasing royal asset, addressing it as a method to prevent the progress of the country. During 1900s, Yi was posted as important posts, such as manager of royal estate, Vice Minister of Ministry of Economy, Commander of Military Police, and Minister of Military. Yi prepared the economic reform based on loans. Gojong of Korea relied on Yi for loan, and under Gojong's support, Yi led the conference about loans with leading powers. In 1899, Yi asked to Hayashi Gonsuke for 1 million won loan. However the contract with the Japanese government was expired. Yi asked American Leigh S. J. Hunt for 5 million Yen loan for mines in Korea. Hunt provided 2 million Yen loan for five mines that were ran by Yi, and 3 million Yen loan for twenty mines under Gungnaebu. In January 1900, Yi started conferences about loan with the Russian minister in Korea. However, Russia did not provide any loan considering Korea's unstable status. When he realized getting loan from Russia was impossible, he met French minister in Korea, Victor Collin de Plancy for loan. The Russian foreign minister Vladimir Lamsdorf agreed with the French loan, claiming that it would restrain the British, and Japanese influence in Korea. In May 1901, Yi received 3 million Won loan from the Mitsui & Co. for Ginseng as guarantee. In 1902, Yi was appointed as the Minister of Economy, and started economic reform. At the dawn of the Russo-Japanese War, Yi persuaded Gojong of Korea to express the neutrality of Korea.

In 1904, when the Japan–Korea Treaty of 1904 was signed, Yi showed his disagreement. Japanese kidnapped Yi for various reasons including his disagreement. As a result, Japan kidnapped Yi and sent him to Japan. The Japanese government also tried to send anti-Japanese politicians such as Gil Young-su, Yi Hak-gyun, and Hyeon Sang-geon to Japan, but failed. Even being kidnapped, Yi learned about new technology and experienced them. He bought a printer, which help the establishments of schools. In May 1905, Yi established the Bosung College by being supported from the country. In May 1905, Yi was appointed as the minister of Military, and Lieutenant General succeeding Min Young-Cheol. Through this appointment, Yi attempted to return to the politics. But, growing Japanese power in Korea was a threat to him. After Japan–Korea Treaty of 1905 was signed, Yi was sent to France by orders of Gojong. However, he was found in China by Japanese. Han Kyu-seol indicted him of being not present when he was the Minister of Military. He lost his position of the minister, and his Order of Taegeuk was confiscated. Yi escaped from Korea and went to Shanghai to plot an anti Japanese conspiracy with M. Pavloff, a former Russian minister at Seoul.

In 1907, he died in the Russian Empire by disease. Yi's final words to Gojong was an advice about concentration to education, and recovering the national sovereignty. Gojong pardoned every punshiments done to Yi. Gojong gave Yi posthumous name of Choong Suk (Hangul: 충숙, Hanja: 忠肅).

Trivial 

 Yi was a very fast walker. He was able to walk about 200 km within 12 hours.
 Yi had about 1,000,000 Won of deposit in his bank account but, what he gave to his son, Yi Jong-ho, was only 330,000 Won. Japanese interrupted his son to get 1,000,000 Won from his account. Also, Japanese interrupted his son getting 330,000 Won from his account. As a result, his son sued the Japanese bank. But, Yi died in 1932. This money is not returned to Yi's descendants until now.

Further reading

Resources 

1854 births
1907 deaths
Lieutenant generals of Korean Empire
19th-century Korean people
20th-century Korean people
Officials of the Korean Empire
Imperial Korean military personnel
Politicians of the Korean Empire